A Nightmare on Drug Street is a 1989 direct-to-video anti-drug short film directed by Traci Wald Donat. The film follows three deceased young characters, Felipe, Jill and Eddie, who now only exist as spirits. They tell their stories of how they each got involved with drugs and consequently perished, Felipe in an accident from drunk driving, Jill from an overdose of cocaine and pills, and Eddie from cardiac arrest from using crack cocaine, respectively.

References

External links

1989 short films
1989 films
American short films
Drug policy of the United States
1980s educational films
Films about cocaine
Films about alcoholism
1980s English-language films
American educational films